Bethel is an Isoko town in Delta State, southern Nigeria.

Politics and Government

Economy

Demographics

Education

Religious Beliefs

References

Populated places in Delta State